Carlos "Lobito" Lobos Muñoz (born 21 December 1980) is a Chilean Olympic eventing rider, FEI cross-country course designer and army officer. He competed at the 2016 Summer Olympics in Rio de Janeiro, where he finished 29th in the individual competition.

Lobos also participated at three Pan American Games (in 2011, 2015 and 2019). His best result came in 2015, when he placed 5th individually. He qualified to compete at the 2020 Summer Olympics in Tokyo, but withdrew from taking part.

References

External links
 

Living people
1980 births
Chilean male equestrians
Chilean Army officers
Equestrians at the 2016 Summer Olympics
Olympic equestrians of Chile
Equestrians at the 2011 Pan American Games
Equestrians at the 2015 Pan American Games
Equestrians at the 2019 Pan American Games
Pan American Games competitors for Chile
20th-century Chilean people
21st-century Chilean people